Mandevilla  is a genus of tropical and subtropical flowering vines belonging to the family Apocynaceae.  It was first described as a genus in 1840. A common name is rocktrumpet.

Mandevilla species are native to the Southwestern United States, Mexico, Central America, the West Indies, and South America. Many originate from the Serra dos Órgãos forests in Rio de Janeiro, Brazil. The genus was named after Henry Mandeville (1773-1861), a British diplomat and gardener.

Cultivation and uses
Mandevillas develop spectacular, often fragrant flowers in warm climates. The flowers come in a variety of colours, including white, pink, yellow, and red. Many hybrids have been developed, mainly deriving from M. × amabilis, M. splendens, and M. sanderi. As climbers, mandevillas can be trained against a wall or trellis to provide a leafy green, and often flowering covering.

The hybrid cultivars Mandevilla × amabilis 'Alice du pont' and ='Sunparapibra'  have won the Royal Horticultural Society's Award of Garden Merit.

Species
Accepted species
 
 Mandevilla abortiva - Bahia, Goiás
 Mandevilla acutiloba - Mexico to Honduras
 Mandevilla aequatorialis - Ecuador
 Mandevilla albifolia - Venezuela
 Mandevilla alboviridis - Peru, Colombia
 Mandevilla amazonica - S Venezuela
 Mandevilla anceps - S Venezuela, NW Brazil
 Mandevilla andina - Bolivia
 Mandevilla angustata - S Venezuela, Guyana
 Mandevilla angustifolia - Bolivia, Paraguay, N Argentina
 Mandevilla annulariifolia - S Venezuela, NW Brazil, SE Colombia
 Mandevilla antioquiana - Antioquia in Colombia
 Mandevilla apocynifolia - Jalisco, Nayarit, Michoacán
 Mandevilla aracamunensis - S Venezuela
 Mandevilla arcuata - Peru, S Colombia
 Mandevilla aridana - Santander in Colombia
 Mandevilla assimilis - Ecuador
 Mandevilla atroviolacea - S Brazil
 Mandevilla bahiensis - Bahia
 Mandevilla barretoi - Minas Gerais
 Mandevilla benthamii - SE Venezuela, Guyana
 Mandevilla bogotensis - NW Venezuela, Ecuador, Colombia
 Mandevilla boliviensis - Costa Rica to Bolivia + E Brazil
 Mandevilla brachyloba - Bolivia, Peru, NW Argentina
 Mandevilla brachysiphon - Arizona, New Mexico, N Mexico
 Mandevilla bracteata - Ecuador, Colombia
 Mandevilla bradei - Goiás
 Mandevilla callacatensis - Peru
 Mandevilla callista - Colombia, Peru, Ecuador, Bolivia
 Mandevilla caquetana - Caquetá in Colombia
 Mandevilla catimbauensis - Pernambuco
 Mandevilla caurensis - SE Colombia, S Venezuela
 Mandevilla cercophylla - Ecuador, SW Colombia, Peru
 Mandevilla clandestina - Brazil
 Mandevilla coccinea - Brazil, Uruguay, Paraguay, NE Argentina
 Mandevilla columbiana - S Colombia
 Mandevilla convolvulacea - Puebla, Oaxaca
 Mandevilla crassinoda - Rio de Janeiro
 Mandevilla cuneifolia - SE Colombia, NW Brazil
 Mandevilla cuspidata - Peru, Bolivia
 Mandevilla dardanoi - Pernambuco
 Mandevilla dissimilis - Ecuador
 Mandevilla duidae - Amazonas in Venezuela
 Mandevilla emarginata - Brazil, Uruguay, Paraguay, NE Argentina, Bolivia
 Mandevilla duartei - Minas Gerais
 Mandevilla equatorialis - Ecuador
 Mandevilla espinosae - Ecuador
 Mandevilla exilicaulis - Michoacán, Colima, Jalisco
 Mandevilla eximia - S Brazil
 Mandevilla filifolia - S Venezuela
 Mandevilla fistulosa - SE Bahia, Espírito Santo
 Mandevilla foliosa - Chihuahua to Oaxaca
 Mandevilla fragilis - Bolivia
 Mandevilla fragrans - S Brazil
 Mandevilla frigida - Piura in Peru
 Mandevilla funiformis - S + SE Brazil
 Mandevilla glandulosa - Peru
 Mandevilla gracilis - S Colombia, NW Brazil, Venezuela, Guyana
 Mandevilla grata - Tucumán in Argentina
 Mandevilla grazielae - E Brazil
 Mandevilla guanabarica - Espírito Santo, Rio de Janeiro
 Mandevilla harleyi - Minas Gerais
 Mandevilla hatschbachii - Bahia
 Mandevilla hesperia - Baja California Sur
 Mandevilla hirsuta - S Mexico to Paraguay
 Mandevilla holosericea - México State to Oaxaca
 Mandevilla holstii - Amazonas in Venezuela
 Mandevilla horrida - Cajamarca
 Mandevilla huberi - Amazonas in Venezuela
 Mandevilla hypoleuca - Mexico, Texas
 Mandevilla illustris - Paraguay, Brazil
 Mandevilla immaculata - S Brazil
 Mandevilla inexperata - Ecuador
 Mandevilla jamesonii - Ecuador
 Mandevilla jasminiflora - Colombia
 Mandevilla javitensis - SE Colombia, NW Brazil, Venezuela, Guyana
 Mandevilla kalmiifolia - Cerro Duida in Venezuela
 Mandevilla krukovii - NW Brazil
 Mandevilla lancibracteata - Colombia, Ecuador, Venezuela
 Mandevilla lancifolia - SE Colombia, S Venezuela
 Mandevilla lanuginosa - S Texas, Mexico
 Mandevilla laxa - Bolivia, Peru, N Argentina
 Mandevilla leptophylla - Bahia, Minas Gerais
 Mandevilla ligustriflora - Ecuador
 Mandevilla lobbii - Peru
 Mandevilla lojana - Ecuador
 Mandevilla longiflora - Bolivia, Paraguay, Uruguay, N Argentina, Brazil
 Mandevilla longipes - Colombia
 Mandevilla lucida - Rio de Janeiro
 Mandevilla luetzelburgii - Espírito Santo 
 Mandevilla macrosiphon NE Mexico, S Texas
 Mandevilla martiana - E Brazil
 Mandevilla martii - C Brazil
 Mandevilla matogrossana - Bolívar in Venezuela, Mato Grosso
 Mandevilla megabracteata - NE Colombia, Guyana
 Mandevilla mexicana - Oaxaca
 Mandevilla microphylla - Bahia
 Mandevilla mollissima - Colombia
 Mandevilla montana  - SW Colombia, Ecuador, Peru
 Mandevilla moricandiana - E Brazil
 Mandevilla moritziana - NE Colombia, Venezuela
 Mandevilla muelleri - SE Brazil
 Mandevilla myriophylla - C Brazil
 Mandevilla nacapulensis - Sonora
 Mandevilla nacarema - Colombia
 Mandevilla nerioides - Colombia, S Venezuela
 Mandevilla nevadana - Magdalena in Colombia
 Mandevilla novocapitalis - C Brazil
 Mandevilla oaxacana - Oaxaca
 Mandevilla obtusifolia - Amazonas in Venezuela
 Mandevilla pachyphylla - Bolívar in Venezuela
 Mandevilla paisae - Antioquia
 Mandevilla pavonii - Colombia to Bolivia
 Mandevilla pendula - SE Brazil
 Mandevilla pentlandiana - Peru, Bolivia, Brazil, N Argentina
 Mandevilla petraea - Paraguay, Uruguay, Bolivia, Brazil, N Argentina
 Mandevilla pohliana - Paraguay, Bolivia, Brazil, N Argentina
 Mandevilla polyantha - Peru
 Mandevilla pristina - Peru
 Mandevilla pubescens - NW Venezuela, Colombia, Ecuador
 Mandevilla puyumato - Colombia
 Mandevilla pycnantha - Minas Gerais
 Mandevilla riparia - Peru, Colombia, Ecuador
 Mandevilla rubra - Minas Gerais
 Mandevilla rugellosa - N + C South America
 Mandevilla rugosa - Guyana, Brazil
 Mandevilla rutila - Peru, Bolivia
 Mandevilla sagittarii - Panama, Colombia, Ecuador
 Mandevilla sancta - Bahia
 Mandevilla sancta-martae - Magdalena in Colombia
 Mandevilla sandemanii - Peru
 Mandevilla sanderi - Rio de Janeiro
 Mandevilla sandwithii - Guyana
 Mandevilla scaberula - N Brazil, Venezuela, Guyana, Fr Guiana
 Mandevilla scabra - tropical South America
 Mandevilla schlimii - Venezuela, Colombia
 Mandevilla scutifolia - Peru
 Mandevilla sellowii  - S Brazil
 Mandevilla semirii  - Minas Gerais
 Mandevilla similaris - SE Venezuela
 Mandevilla speciosa - N Brazil, Venezuela, Guyana, Colombia
 Mandevilla spigeliiflora - Brazil, Paraguay, Bolivia
 Mandevilla splendens - Rio de Janeiro
 Mandevilla steyermarkii - S Venezuela, SE Colombia
 Mandevilla subcarnosa - N Brazil, Venezuela, Guyana, Colombia
 Mandevilla subcordata - Bolivia
 Mandevilla subsagittata - Mexico to Peru; Cuba, Trinidad
 Mandevilla subscorpoidea - Guatemala, S Mexico
 Mandevilla subsessilis - C Mexico to El Salvador
 Mandevilla subumbelliflora - Peru
 Mandevilla surinamensis  - Venezuela, 3 Guianas
 Mandevilla symphytocarpa - Trinidad to Bolivia
 Mandevilla tenuifolia - Suriname, Brazil
 Mandevilla thevetioides - SE Colombia
 Mandevilla torosa - Tamaulipas to Honduras; Cuba, Jamaica
 Mandevilla trianae - Guyana to Peru
 Mandevilla tricolor - Ecuador
 Mandevilla tristis - Táchira
 Mandevilla tubiflora - NW Mexico to Nicaragua
 Mandevilla turgida - S Venezuela
 Mandevilla ulei - NW Brazil
 Mandevilla undulata - Paraguay, Misiones
 Mandevilla urceolata - Rio de Janeiro
 Mandevilla urophylla - SE Brazil
 Mandevilla vanheurckii - Venezuela, Peru, NW Brazil
 Mandevilla vasquezii - Peru
 Mandevilla velame - Brazil
 Mandevilla venulosa - Minas Gerais, São Paulo
 Mandevilla veraguasensis - S Central America, NW South America
 Mandevilla versicolor - Peru, Ecuador
 Mandevilla villosa - Chiapas to S Venezuela
 Mandevilla virescens  - S Brazil, Paraguay, NE Argentina
 Mandevilla widgrenii - Brazil, Paraguay
 Mandevilla xerophytica - Boyaca in Colombia

Gallery

References

External links

The Clemson University Cooperative Extension Service
Mandevilla Plant Expert Gardening, Q & A

 
Apocynaceae genera
Vines
Ayahuasca